Hornsea Museum is a local museum in Hornsea, East Riding of Yorkshire, northern England.

History
The museum was established in 1978. It is housed in an 18th-century farmhouse and two cottages. The museum is a registered charity (No. 509615) and is largely run by volunteers.  The museum is a member of the Holderness museums collaboration.

The farmhouse was occupied by the Burn family for almost 300 years. The museum presents Victorian rural life and local history concerning north Holderness. Rooms present life in Victorian times, including a bedroom, the dairy, kitchen, parlour, and wash-house.

Outside the farmhouse, set in a large garden, are a barn, craft workshops, a Victorian school room and a Victorian street scene. In addition, there is an exhibition room showing militaria and another exhibiting childhood and toys.
The Whitedale building has displays on the history of the Hull and Hornsea Railway and Hornsea's fishing heritage.

The cottages have exhibition rooms containing some 2,000 items of Hornsea Pottery.

References

External links 

 Hornsea Museum website

Museums established in 1978
Local museums in the East Riding of Yorkshire
Art museums and galleries in the East Riding of Yorkshire
Decorative arts museums in England
English pottery
Museums in the East Riding of Yorkshire
1978 establishments in England
Ceramics museums in the United Kingdom
Hornsea